WGOK (900 AM), "Gospel 900") is a radio station serving the Mobile, Alabama, area with a Gospel music format. The station is under ownership of Cumulus Media.  Its studios are on Dauphin Avenue in Midtown Mobile, and its transmitter is northwest of downtown.

History
The radio station in the early 1960s was located at 900 Gum Street right in the middle of a swamp. The station was part of the largest chain of black radio stations in the country called The OK Group.  All of the stations in the OK Group had an OK at the end of their call letters.  There was WGOK in Mobile, KYOK in Houston, and WBOK in New Orleans for example.  There were other OK stations in the cities of Memphis, Tennessee and Baton Rouge, Louisiana among others.  There was one White station in Alice, Texas with the OK reversed.  It was called KOPY.

In the early 1960s disc jockeys had names like Topsy Turvey, Miss Mandy, and the Reverend A. J. Crawford. The station was very popular and played rhythm and blues records as well as gospel records.

Currently, it plays Gospel music.

Ownership
In 1999, the station was acquired by Citadel Communications Corp. (Lawrence R. Wilson, chairman) from Fuller-Jeffrey Broadcasting Co. Inc. (Robert Fuller, president) along with sister station WYOK for a reported sale price of $6 million.

References

External links
Gospel 900 official website

GOK
Gospel radio stations in the United States
Radio stations established in 1959
1959 establishments in Alabama
Cumulus Media radio stations
GOK